{{DISPLAYTITLE:C15H20O5}}
The molecular formula C15H20O5 (molar mass: 280.316 g/mol, exact mass: 280.1311 u) may refer to:

 Koningic acid, or heptelidic acid
 Phaseic acid

Molecular formulas